Bolshiye Shidy (Olo Şiźe) is a rural locality (a village) in Bashshidinsky Selsoviet, Nurimanovsky District, Bashkortostan, Russia. The population was 456 as of 2010. There are 11 streets.

Geography 
Bolshiye Shidy is located 9 km southeast of Krasnaya Gorka (the district's administrative centre) by road. Bash-Shidy is the nearest rural locality.

References 

Rural localities in Nurimanovsky District